The 2020 Uber Cup group stage was held at the Ceres Arena in Aarhus, Denmark, from 9 to 13 October 2021.

The group stage was the first stage of the 2020 Uber Cup. The two highest-placing teams in each group advanced to the knockout stage.

Draw
The original draw for the tournament was conducted on 3 August 2020, at 15:00 MST, at BWF Headquarters in Kuala Lumpur. BWF then decided to redraw the tournament after the postponement from 2020 to 2021 this time to be conducted on 18 August 2021, at 15:00 MST also at the BWF headquarters in Kuala Lumpur. The 16 teams were drawn to four groups of four and were allocated to three pots based on the World Team Rankings of 18 February 2021.

Group composition

Group A

Indonesia vs Germany

Japan vs France

Indonesia vs France

Japan vs Germany

Japan vs Indonesia

Germany vs France

Group B

India vs Spain

Thailand vs Scotland

Thailand vs Spain

India vs Scotland

Thailand vs India

Spain vs Scotland

Group C

Korea vs Tahiti

Chinese Taipei vs Egypt

Chinese Taipei vs Tahiti

Korea vs Egypt

Egypt vs Tahiti

Korea vs Chinese Taipei

Group D

China vs Canada

Denmark vs Malaysia

China vs Malaysia

Denmark vs Canada

Malaysia vs Canada

China vs Denmark

References

Uber Group stage